Aiken Mile Track, located in Aiken, South Carolina, was built around 1936 during the heart of the Great Depression. Horses and horse racing is known as the “sport of kings.” Within that context it is significant that such a track should be built during a time of nationwide double-digit unemployment, and noteworthy in the sense that it contributed to Aiken's success as an equestrian center and “Winter Colony” during those difficult days. The landmark consists of outbuildings as well, including numerous barns. It is an accessible landmark, no more than a few miles from downtown Aiken.  Aiken Mile Track was listed in the National Register of Historic Places on May 9, 1985.

References

External links
 

Sports venues completed in 1936
Sports venues in Aiken County, South Carolina
Horse racing venues in South Carolina
National Register of Historic Places in Aiken County, South Carolina
Historic districts on the National Register of Historic Places in South Carolina
Sports venues on the National Register of Historic Places in South Carolina
Buildings and structures in Aiken, South Carolina
1936 establishments in South Carolina